Batas Militar (marketed as Batas Militar: A Documentary on Martial Law in the Philippines) is a 1997 Filipino television documentary film about martial law under Ferdinand Marcos, and the ouster movement against him, the People Power Revolution. The film was directed by Jon Red and Jeannette Ifurung, with the former focusing on dramatizations. 

The documentary was broadcast on September 21, 1997. The documentary was subsequently released on VHS.

Synopsis
It features the human rights violations during martial law in the Philippines, the economy, and the biographies of Ferdinand Marcos, his wife Imelda Marcos, and his prominent critic ,Benigno Aquino Jr.

Interviewees
The following is a list of interviewees in the documentary, conducted from March until May 1997:

 Satur Ocampo (National Democratic Front [NDF] founder, Bayan Muna representative)
 Jovito Salonga (senator)
 Bernabe Buscayno (New People's Army [NPA] founder)
 Raul Manglapus (1965 presidential candidate, Con-Con delegate, Movement for a Free Philippines chair)
 Romeo Espino (chief-of-staff of the Armed Forces of the Philippines [AFP] from 1972 to 1981)
 Manuel Yan (chief-of-staff of the Armed Forces of the Philippines [AFP] from 1968 to 1972)
 Rafael Ileto (vice chief-of-staff of the AFP)
 Bonifacio Gillego (World War II veteran, congressman)
 Blas Ople (Secretary/Minister of Labor from 1967 to 1986, senator)
 Onofre Corpuz (Secretary of Education from 1968 to 1971)
 Imelda Marcos (First Lady of the Philippines from 1965 to 1986)
 Corazon Aquino (President of the Philippines from 1986 to 1992, wife of Benigno Aquino Jr.)
 Haydee Yorac (Chairman of the Presidential Commission on Good Government, COMELEC chairperson)
 Fidel Ramos (President of the Philippines from 1992 to 1998, chair of the Philippine Constabulary [PC] during the Marcos regime)
 Carolina Hernandez (human rights political scientist)
 Joker Arroyo (human rights lawyer during the Marcos regime, congressman and senator)
 Mariani Dimaranan (political detainee during Martial Law) 
 Nena Fajardo (victim of the human rights violation during Martial Law)
 Rafael Zagala (chief of the Philippine Army during the Marcos regime)
 Priscilla Mijares (judge, widow of Primitivo Mijares)
 Letty Jimenez Magsanoc (journalist)
 Carmen Pedrosa (author)
 Behn Cervantes (film director)
 Francisco Nemenzo Jr. (political scientist)
 Eugenio Lopez Jr. (businessman, chief executive officer of ABS-CBN from 1956 to 1993)
 Vicente Paterno (technocrat during the Marcos regime, Secretary/Minister of Industry from 1974 to 1979)
 Solita Monsod (economist)
 Edicio de la Torre (founding chairperson of Christians for National Liberation)
 Ma. Ceres Doyo (journalist)
 Aquilino Pimentel Jr. (Con-Con delegate, 1978 Lakas ng Bayan candidate)
 Ed Olaguer (Light a Fire Movement founder)
 Doris Baffrey (April 6 Movement founder)
 Teodoro Benigno (journalist of Agence France-Presse in the Philippines)
 Jose Almonte (Reform the Armed Forces Movement founder)
 Butz Aquino (August Twenty-One Movement founder, congressman)
 Jaime Sin (Archbishop of Manila)
 June Keithley (radio and television reporter)

Production
Eugenia Apostol, a journalist and publisher, brought a film crew together to create a documentary under her newly established Foundation for Worldwide People Power (renamed as the Eggie Apostol Foundation in 2012) about the injustices committed during the two-decade presidency of Ferdinand Marcos. Jon Red and Jeannette Ifurung became the film's pair of directors, with the former focusing on dramatizations and shoots on location, while the latter focused on post-production. The resulting work became the most expensive documentary film produced in the Philippines.

Release
Batas Militar aired on Philippine television network ABS-CBN on September 21, 1997, and was repeated on February 25, 2016, airing on PTV in 1998 and 2012, ABS-CBN News Channel in 2012 and 2016, and Knowledge Channel from 2011 until 2012. Afterwards, it was subsequently released on VHS. As of 2016, the documentary has not yet been released on the DVD format. However, filmmaker Mike de Leon has since posted the entire film on Vimeo with English subtitles through his Citizen Jake production account on February 1, 2019.

See also
List of films about martial law in the Philippines

References

External links
 
 
 

1997 films
1997 documentary films
1997 television films
Documentary films about politics
Filipino-language films
Philippine documentary films
Philippine television films
Presidency of Ferdinand Marcos
ABS-CBN television specials
Martial law under Ferdinand Marcos